Puguli or Phuie (Pwĩẽ) is the language of the Phuo people. It is spoken in Burkina Faso.

Writing System 

Nasalization is indicated with a tilde: ã ẽ ɛ̃ ĩ ɩ̃ õ ɔ̃ ũ ʋ̃. The tilde is not indicated in the presence of a nasal consonant or when the first nasalized vowel is indicated.

The high tone, the most frequent, is not indicated. The low tone is indicated with the grave accent: à è ɛ̀ ì ɩ̀ ò ɔ̀ ù ʋ̀ ã̀ ẽ̀ ɛ̃̀ ĩ̀ ɩ̃̀ ɔ̃̀ õ̀ ɔ̃̀ ũ̀ ʋ̃̀ and the low high tone is indicated with an acute accent: á é ɛ́ í ɩ́ ó ɔ́ ú ʋ́ ã́ ẽ́ ɛ̃́ ĩ́ ɩ̃́ ṍ ɔ̃́ ṹ ʋ̃́.

References

Languages of Burkina Faso
Gurunsi languages